A Woman Between Two Worlds (Italian:Una donna tra due mondi) is a 1936 Italian "white-telephones" drama film directed by Goffredo Alessandrini and starring Isa Miranda, Assia Noris and Giulio Donadio. The film's sets were designed by art director Hans Ledersteger. It is the Italian version of the German film The Love of the Maharaja. The film largely takes place in a grand hotel setting.

It was shot at the Cines Studios in Rome.

Cast
Isa Miranda as  Mina Salviati
Assia Noris as Daisy Atkins
Giulio Donadio as Suraj 
Váša Příhoda as Saverio Lancia
Mario Ferrari as dottor Lawburn
Oreste Bilancia as Saverio Lancia
Tatiana Pavoni as Mimi
Ernesto Sabatini as Lord Winston
Vinicio Sofia as l'amministratore di Trenchman
Renato Malavasi as il segretario di Trenchman
Alfredo Martinelli as Il barbiere
Gino Viotti as Il direttore dell'hotel  
Olinto Cristina
Carlo Petrangeli

References

Bibliography
Clarke, David B. & Doel, Marcus A. Moving Pictures/Stopping Places: Hotels and Motels on Film. Lexington Books, 2009.

External links

A Woman Between Two Worlds at Variety Distribution

1936 films
Italian drama films
1936 drama films
1930s Italian-language films
Films directed by Goffredo Alessandrini
Italian multilingual films
Italian black-and-white films
Films based on German novels
Cines Studios films
1936 multilingual films
Films set in India
Cultural depictions of Indian monarchs
1930s Italian films